The Charles H. Ingraham House is a historic house at 907 Popham Road in Phippsburg, Maine.  Built in 1897, it is one of the finest Shingle style houses in Phippsburg, and is Maine's only known design by Providence, Rhode Island architect Howard K. Hilton.  The house is now known as Stonehouse Manor, a bed and breakfast inn.

Description and history
The Ingraham House is located in southernmost Phippsburg, sandwiched on a rural parcel between a wooded section of northern Popham Beach State Park and Fort Baldwin Memorial Park.  It is a -story wood-frame structure, with a gabled roof extending over the top  stories, and extending over a front porch featured a fieldstone skirt and posts.  The roofline is punctured by a variety of dormers, in different sizes and roof treatments.  The interior retains original high-quality woodwork and leaded windows, with bedroom fireplaces featuring unique custom tilework in a vaguely Moorish theme.  Its main entrance and staircase are stylistically reminiscent of interior designs of H.H. Richardson.

The house was built in 1897 for Charles H. Ingraham, a banker from Providence, Rhode Island.  Designed by Providence architect Howard K. Hilton, who was best known for his work in Rhode Island and Massachusetts, it is the only known design of his in Maine.  Ingraham had apparently harbored hopes that a fashionable summer colony would develop around his property and an adjacent hotel (now demolished).  Since 1996 it has been operated as a bed and breakfast inn.

See also
National Register of Historic Places listings in Sagadahoc County, Maine

References

External links
Stonehouse Manor web site

Houses on the National Register of Historic Places in Maine
Houses completed in 1897
Houses in Sagadahoc County, Maine
Phippsburg, Maine
Hotels in Maine
National Register of Historic Places in Sagadahoc County, Maine
Shingle Style houses
Shingle Style architecture in Maine